Zarneh Rural District is a rural district (dehestan) in Zarneh District, Eyvan County, Ilam Province, Iran. At the 2006 census, its population was 2,778, in 571 families.  The rural district has 15 villages.

References 

Rural Districts of Ilam Province
Eyvan County